The Barzona are a breed of beef cattle, developed in the United States, in the high desert, inter-mountain region of Arizona in the 1940s and 1950s. They are, in approximately equal proportions, a combination of Africander, Hereford, Beef Shorthorn and Angus. They have been bred to be especially hardy, having good heat, insect and disease tolerance.

References

Cattle breeds originating in the United States
Cattle breeds